Daniel Snyder (born 1964) is an American businessman who is the owner of the Washington Commanders.

Dan or Daniel Snyder may also refer to:
Dan Snyder (ice hockey) (1978–2003), Canadian ice hockey player
Daniel J. Snyder, American TV and film producer
Daniel John Snyder Jr. (1916–1980), United States federal judge

See also

Dan Schneider (disambiguation)